Adina Bar-Shalom (born 1945) is an Israeli educator, columnist, and social activist. She is the founder of the first college for Haredi students in Jerusalem, and has spent years working to overcome gender discrimination
in the Orthodox Jewish community. She was awarded the Israel Prize for lifetime achievement and special contribution to society in 2014.

Biography
Adina Yosef (Bar-Shalom) was born in Jerusalem, the eldest daughter of Rabbi Ovadia Yosef and Margalit Fattal. From age 3 to 6, she lived in Cairo, Egypt, where her father served as deputy chief rabbi. She is a graduate of the Bais Yaakov girls' school network. As a teenager, she studied tailoring at a Bais Yaakov professional institution.

At eighteen, she married Rabbi Ezra Bar-Shalom, then taught sewing, and opened a fellowship for young brides for several years. In 1975, she began to study fashion design at the Shenkar College of Engineering and Design, after her husband and her father had opposed her plans to study psychology at a university.

In 2001, with the permission of her father, Bar-Shalom founded Haredi College of Jerusalem, the first higher education institution in that city designed for the Haredi sector.

Bar-Shalom resides in the Ramat Aviv neighborhood of Tel Aviv with her husband, who is a rabbinical court judge and formerly served as president of the Tel Aviv Beit Din. The couple has three children. Their daughter, Chana, who was the director of former MK Shlomo Benizri's office, is married to lawyer Moshe Shimoni, director general of the farmers' union and former director general of the Ministry of Religious Services.

Political and social activism
Bar-Shalom became involved in politics as a member of the Tafnit social protest group, led by Uzi Dayan, but left when the movement evolved into a political party and ran in the 2006 Knesset elections (though it failed to cross the threshold). She then founded a forum for dialogue between religious and secular Jews in Israel. In the summer of 2011, she worked on the Spivak-Yona committee to address social inequality.

In early April 2011, she signed a petition calling for withdrawal from the Golan Heights and to create, generally following the 1967 borders, a Palestinian state with East Jerusalem as its capital.

Bar-Shalom regularly speaks about the importance of women's education and work, and in 2013 supported a women's-only political party in the Haredi town of El'ad. In addition, in early 2014, she considered a bid to become the president of Israel. In March 2014, Bar-Shalom wrote that the Haredi feminist revolution is already here, writing that, "The train has left the station".

Awards and recognition
In December 2012, she was honored as a "Knight of Quality Government" by the Movement for Quality Government in Israel. In 2013, Bar-Shalom was selected by Nashim magazine, part of the Makor Rishon newspaper, as one of the twenty most influential religious women in Israel. In April 2013, she received an honorary doctorate from Ben-Gurion University of the Negev.

References

1945 births
Living people
Israel Prize women recipients
Israel Prize for lifetime achievement & special contribution to society recipients
Ovadia Yosef
Israeli people of Iraqi-Jewish descent
Israeli Orthodox Jews
Israeli feminists
Rebbetzins
Orthodox Jewish feminists